Andean culture is a collective term used to refer to the indigenous peoples of the Andes mountains especially those that came under the influence of the Inca Empire. Cultures considered Andean include:
 Atacama people
 Aymara people
 Muisca people or Chibcha
 Andean civilizations
 Quechua people
 Uru people
 Diaguita people
 Montegrande (archaeological site)

This term is also used to describe the Hispanic based cultures of the Andes, which through the interaction of the Spaniards with the Andean Natives formed into a distinct group of cultures incorporating both Hispanic and Indigenous cultural traits, although such a definition excludes the contribution of other human groups and ethnicities inhabiting in the Andean mountains, such as non Andean indigenous groups, African diaspora in the Americas or Asian immigrants. These cultures include:
 Culture of Bolivia
 Culture of Chile
 Colombian culture
 Culture of Ecuador
 Argentine Northwest
 Culture of Peru